The 1933 Italian Grand Prix (formally the XI Gran Premio d'Italia) was a Grand Prix motor race held at Monza on 10 September 1933. The race was held over 50 laps of a 10 km circuit for a total race distance of 500 km and was won by Luigi Fagioli driving an Alfa Romeo.

The same day, the Monza Grand Prix was held on the same site, but using only the banked oval circuit. Three top drivers: Giuseppe Campari, Baconin Borzacchini and Stanislas Czaykowski were killed in two separate accidents.

Starting Grid (4-4-4): Positions Drawn

Classification

Fastest Lap:  Luigi Fagioli, 3m13.2 (186.34 km/h)

References

Italian Grand Prix
Italian Grand Prix
Grand Prix